Sergei L. Sedov (1937) was a Soviet engineer and scientist killed in the Great Purge for being the son of Leon Trotsky.

Personal life
He was an apolitical engineer and scientist. His daughter, Yulia, was born three months after his 1935 exile.

Arrest and death
Despite having taken his mother's surname to avoid political affiliation with his father, in 1935 Sedov "was arrested on trumped-up charges [and] refused to betray [Trotsky]".  That year, the Gulag banished Sedov from Moscow to the Siberian city of Krasnoyarsk.  Sedov died in 1937, though accounts differ the specifics: some records claim he was killed in a prison uprising, others allege he was shot in Krasnoyarsk after being accused of a poisoning plot, while The New York Times in 1988 asserted that he was returned to Moscow and shot for Trotsky allegedly plotting to kill Joseph Stalin.

After Sedov's daughter Yulia Akselrod petitioned Soviet President Mikhail Gorbachev, Sedov was rehabilitated in late 1988 by the Supreme Court of the Soviet Union.

References

1900s births
1937 deaths
Great Purge victims from Russia
Leon Trotsky
people who died in the Gulag
Soviet rehabilitations